The Undersecretariat of Public Order and Security of the Ministry of the Interior (KDGM) was the governmental intelligence organization of Turkey.

KDGM was structured as an organization to plan combat against terrorism with a multidimensional and holistic approach and effectively coordinate by also considering social values and dynamics, to play a pioneering role in minimizing terrorism through its policies and strategies, who adopts superiority of law and respect to basic rights and freedoms as principles. KDGM has begun its works with a proactive approach to produce projects which are open to cooperation, solution-oriented, mindful for accurate and effective communication and socially responsible.

It was closed on July 9, 2018 and all rights and obligations were transferred to the Ministry of Interior.

References

Law enforcement in Turkey